Ramon Sinkeldam (born 9 February 1989) is a Dutch cyclist, who currently rides for UCI WorldTeam .

Career

Amateur career
During this time, he won the Paris–Roubaix Espoirs race in 2011, as well as winning the 2011 Ronde van Limburg and the national under-23 road race championships in 2011, having finished second in the two previous years. In his youth Sinkeldam was also active in mountain biking and in cyclocross.

Professional career
Sinkeldam turned professional for the 2012 season, joining the  team. He achieved his first professional victories with the team in October 2012, winning two stages at the Tour of Hainan in China. He finished the race sixth overall. He was named in the start list for the 2015 Tour de France. He earned no wins in 2013, but did place 3rd overall at 2.HC race Four Days of Dunkirk. In 2014, Sinkeldam won the second stage of the World Ports Classic and finished in 2nd overall. 2015 was his most successful season yet, as he won one day events Velothon Berlin and Binche–Chimay–Binche. Sinkeldam was also 2nd in the Dutch National Road Race Championships, behind Niki Terpstra.

On 23 January 2016, he was one of the six members of the  who were hit by a car which drove into on-coming traffic while they were training in Spain. All riders were in stable condition.

In May 2019, he was named in the startlist for the 2019 Giro d'Italia.

Major results
Source: 

2006
 3rd Road race, National Junior Road Championships
2009
 2nd Road race, National Under-23 Road Championships
2010
 2nd Road race, National Under-23 Road Championships
 9th Münsterland Giro
2011
 1st  Road race, National Under-23 Road Championships
 1st Paris–Roubaix Espoirs
 1st Ronde van Limburg
 5th Overall Olympia's Tour
 8th Overall Volta ao Alentejo
2012
 6th Overall Tour of Hainan
1st Stages 5 & 8
2013
 2nd Ronde van Zeeland Seaports
 3rd Overall Four Days of Dunkirk
2014
 2nd Overall World Ports Classic
1st  Young rider classification
1st Stage 2
 2nd Overall Tour de Picardie
 2nd Ronde van Zeeland Seaports
 6th Grand Prix Impanis-Van Petegem
2015
 1st Velothon Berlin
 1st Binche–Chimay–Binche
 2nd Road race, National Road Championships
 8th Vattenfall Cyclassics
2017
 1st  Road race, National Road Championships
 9th Scheldeprijs
2018
 1st Paris–Chauny
 3rd Road race, National Road Championships
2019
 1st  Team relay, UEC European Road Championships
2022
 6th Tour de Vendée

Grand Tour general classification results timeline

References

External links

1989 births
Living people
Dutch male cyclists
People from Wormerland
UCI Road World Championships cyclists for the Netherlands
Cyclists from North Holland